Philip Illingworth (born 10 December 1948) is a Canadian judoka. He competed in the men's middleweight event at the 1972 Summer Olympics.

References

1948 births
Living people
Canadian male judoka
Olympic judoka of Canada
Judoka at the 1972 Summer Olympics
Sportspeople from Alberta